The 1972 Washington State Cougars football team was an American football team that represented Washington State University in the Pacific-8 Conference (Pac-8) during the 1972 NCAA University Division football season.

The team's statistical leaders included Ty Payne with 1,349 passing yards, Ken Grandberry with 833 rushing yards, and Brock Aynsley with 344 receiving yards.

Schedule

Roster

All-conference

Two Washington State players, both offensive linemen, were named to the all-conference team: senior tackle Bill Moos and sophomore guard Steve Ostermann. On the second team (honorable mention) was linebacker Clyde Warehime. Ostermann returned to the first team in 1973 and 1974.

NFL Draft
One Cougar was selected in the 1973 NFL Draft

References

External links
 Game program: Utah at Washington State – September 30, 1972 – Martin Stadium debut
 Game program: Oregon State at Washington State – October 21, 1972 
 Game program: #1 USC vs. Washington State at Seattle – November 4, 1972 
 Game program: Stanford at Washington State – November 11, 1972
 Game program: Washington vs. Washington State at Spokane – November 18, 1972

Washington State
Washington State Cougars football seasons
Washington State Cougars football